Neolaphyra is a genus of beetles in the family Cicindelidae, containing the following species:

 Neolaphyra leucosticta (Fairmaire, 1859)
 Neolaphyra peletieri (Lucas, 1848)
 Neolaphyra ritchiei (Vigors, 1825)
 Neolaphyra truquii (Guerin-Meneville, 1855)

References

Cicindelidae